Beryx mollis is a member of the family Berycidae. It can reach sizes of up to  SL.

References

Beryx
Fish of Japan
Fish of the Indian Ocean
Fish described in 1959